Philippe Aerts (born 21 June 1964) is a Belgian jazz double bassist. He taught himself guitar and electric bass guitar when he was 11 and started playing the double bass at age 14. He is a member of Philip Catherine trio and the Ivan Paduart trio. He also has his own trio with John Ruocco (tenor saxophone and clarinet) and Tony Levin (drums) and quartet with Bert Joris (trumpet). He won the Belgian Golden Django in 2002 for best Belgian artist.

Bands 
He has recorded with:
 Charles Loos trio
 Diederik Wissels trio
 Nathalie Loriers
 Michel Herr
 Jacques Pelzer
 Steve Houben
 Ivan Paduart trio
 Philip Catherine trio
 Bert Joris quartet
 Toshiko Akiyoshi Jazz Orchestra

He has toured with: 
 Richard Galliano and Gary Burton

References 

 Jazz in Belgium biography

Belgian jazz musicians
Jazz double-bassists
1964 births
Living people
21st-century double-bassists
Igloo Records artists